DOS 6 or DOS-6 may refer to:

In computing:
DR DOS 6.0 by Novell
MS-DOS 6.x by Microsoft
IBM PC DOS 6.x by IBM
Novell DOS 7, which reports itself as "PC DOS 6.0"
DR-DOS 7.x, which reports itself as "PC DOS 6.0"
ROM-DOS 6.22 by Datalight
Paragon DOS Pro 2000 by PhysTechSoft
PTS-DOS 6.x by PhysTechSoft

Others:
 DOS-6, Soviet space station Salyut 7

See also
DOS 5 (disambiguation)
DOS 7 (disambiguation)
DOS (disambiguation)